Ashok Panagariya (22 August 1950 – 11 June 2021) was an Indian neurologist, medical researcher and academic, known for his research on nerve cells and neuromyotonia. He was a vice chancellor of Rajasthan University of Health Sciences, Jaipur and a member of the Planning Board of the Government of Rajasthan. He was a recipient of the Dr. B. C. Roy Award, the highest Indian award in the medical category. Dr. Ashok Panagariya was awarded the fourth highest Indian civilian award of Padma Shri by the Government of India in 2014. He died on 11 June 2021 due to COVID-19 complications.

Biography
Ashok Panagariya was born on 22 August 1950 in Jaipur, in the Indian state of Rajasthan, in a family of freedom fighters. His father Sh. Balu Lal Panagariya was a civil servant in the govt of Rajasthan. He  obtained his MBBS in the year 1972 and completed post-graduate training in Internal Medicine in 1976 at the Sawai Man Singh Medical College; he then obtained his DM in Neurology at PGI Chandigarh and became a fellow of the Royal College of Physicians. He headed the department of neurology at the SMS Medical College and became the Principal of the institution. He also served as vice chancellor of Rajasthan University of Health Sciences, as the president of Indian Academy of Neurology 2010–2011 and was a member of the State Planning Board on health.

Positions
Panagariya was a professor emeritus of the SMS Medical College and an honorary neurologist to the Armed Forces of India. He was the chairman of DISHA Foundation, a non-profit non-governmental organization engaged in the welfare of people with special needs. He was also associated with the Post Graduate Institute of Medical Education and Research, Chandigarh and the Press Club of Jaipur, as a member.

Honours
Panagariya received the Merit award from the Government of Rajasthan in 1992. The Medical Council of India awarded him the Dr. B. C. Roy Award, the highest Indian award in the medical category, in 2002. He was awarded the civilian honour of Padma Shri in 2014 by the Government of India. He was a recipient of the UNESCO Award for medical/social contributions, the Lifetime Achievement Award from The Times of India and of the Lifetime Achievement Award of Madras Neuro Trust.

Publications
Panagariya had more than ninety publications in peer reviewed journals and contributed to a textbook on neurology by Walter George Bradley. He also wrote on health issues and the science of spiritualism.

Explanatory notes

References

External links
 "Haematology lab at SMS soon". The Times of India. 21 March 2010. Archived from the original on 26 January 2013. Retrieved 1 July 2015.

1950 births
2021 deaths
20th-century Indian medical doctors
Deaths from the COVID-19 pandemic in India
Dr. B. C. Roy Award winners
Indian neurologists
Medical doctors from Rajasthan
Recipients of the Padma Shri in medicine
Scientists from Jaipur
University of Rajasthan alumni
Postgraduate Institute of Medical Education and Research alumni